Sheraton Hsinchu Hotel is located in Zhubei City, Hsinchu County, Taiwan. Opened on 3 April 2010, the hotel has 386 rooms and suites and has facilities such as a business center, fitness center, temperature controlled swimming pool and sauna. It is a franchise of Sheraton Hotels and Resorts.

Restaurants and Bars
Yue: A Cantonese restaurant located on the 4th floor serving traditional dim sum and other Chinese dishes.
Moon: A Japanese restaurant located on the 2nd floor.
Feast: A buffet restaurant with Halal certification serving a variety of dishes from all around the world.
Kanpai Classic: A Japanese barbecue restaurant on the 2nd floor.
Light Bar: Bar serving whiskey and cocktails.
Lobby Lounge: Located on the ground floor, the lounge serves craft beer and afternoon tea.
Fresh Corner: A pastry shop offering a variety of breads, cakes, pastries and desserts.

Public transportation
The hotel is located around 25 minutes' walk or 10 minute drive from Hsinchu HSR station.

Gallery

See also
Ambassador Hotel Hsinchu
Sheraton Hotels and Resorts
Sheraton Grand Taipei Hotel
Sheraton Taitung Hotel
Sheraton Taoyuan Hotel

References

External links

 Sheraton Hsinchu Hotel official site

Hsinchu
Hotel buildings completed in 2009
2010 establishments in Taiwan
Hotels established in 2010
Hotels in Taiwan